Victoria Park / Pakapakanthi, also known as Park 16, is a park located in the Southeastern Park Lands of the South Australian capital of Adelaide. It is bordered by Fullarton Road, Greenhill Road, East Terrace and Wakefield Road.

It hosts a variety of major events throughout the year, the most prominent of which have been the Formula 1 from 1985 to 1995, and from 1999 the Adelaide 500. This race was cancelled in 2020 for the 2021 season, because of the COVID-19 pandemic in Australia, but returned in December 2022.

History

The park's most prominent feature was the Victoria Park Racecourse, formerly the home course of the Adelaide Racing Club prior to its amalgamation with the South Australian Jockey Club; the main track was 2,360 metres long, with the longest home-straight of any horse racing track in Australia. 

Iconic races such as the Grand National Hurdle and the Adelaide Grand National were run on the track and won by South Australia's leading cross-country jockey Jack McGowan of Brooklyn Park in the late 1800s.

Following the rejection of a proposal to upgrade horse and motor racing facilities in early 2008, the SAJC vacated the premises, moving their home course to Morphettville Racecourse. The 1950s-era SAJC grandstand was demolished, as was a large brick wall adjacent Fullarton Road and other utility buildings. The heritage-listed 1880s-era grandstand will be refurbished as part of a $16 million upgrade of the park's facilities. The park remains one of the venues for the Adelaide International Horse Trials.

In August 2008, the Adelaide City Council announced plans to turn Victoria Park into a "people's park", incorporating wetlands, community sporting facilities, walking tracks and temporary motor racing facilities.

Part of the Adelaide Street Circuit was built in the northern portion of the park. Temporary grandstands and other facilities were erected whenever motor racing events were hosted there. The Australian Grand Prix took place from 1985 to 1995, and a one-off Le Mans series event, the Race of a Thousand Years on 31 December 2000.

The circuit hosted the Adelaide 500 from 1999 until 2020; its cancellation for 2021 was announced due to the COVID-19 pandemic in Australia, and declining attendance. In 2020, the government established a COVID-19 testing site inside the park. The Adelaide 500 returned as the final round of the 2022 series.

Description
Victoria Park / Pakapakanthi is also known as Park 16. It is located in the Southeastern Park Lands

References

Horse racing venues in Australia
Parks in Adelaide
Sports venues in Adelaide